Ahli al-Khaleel is a Palestinian professional football team from the city of Hebron, that plays in the West Bank Premier League.

History
Ahli Al-Khaleel won the 2015 edition of the Palestine Cup and qualified for the 2016 AFC Cup.

Domestic history

Continental history
As of 11 May 2016.

Honours
West Bank Premier League
 Champions (1): 2015–16
 Palestine Cup
 Champions (1): 2014–15, 2015–16
 West Bank Super Cup
 Champions (2): 2015, 2016

Current squad

References

Football clubs in the West Bank
Association football clubs established in 1974
1974 establishments in the Israeli Military Governorate